Töre River (Swedish: Töreälven or Töre älv) is a river in Norrbotten in Sweden. It discharges into Törefjärden, which is the northernmost part of the Bothnian Bay and therefore of the Gulf of Bothnia and of the Baltic Sea.

References

Drainage basins of the Baltic Sea
Rivers of Norrbotten County